Miss Philippines Earth 2008 was the 8th edition of Miss Philippines Earth pageant. It was held last May 11, 2008 at the Crowne Plaza Manila Galleria, Ortigas Center, Quezon City, Philippines. The event was broadcast by ABS-CBN Network in the Philippines at 10 'o clock in the evening and The Filipino Channel internationally. The pageant was hosted by Rafael Rosell together with Nikki Gil and Ginger Conejero.

Forty-one delegates competed for the title, held by Jeanne Harn of the National Capital Region. At the conclusion of the final night of competition, Karla Paula Henry of Cebu was crowned Miss Philippines Earth in the eight edition of the environmentally-conscious beauty pageant.

Marie Razel Eguia of Dipolog, won the Miss Air (2nd Runner-up) and competed in Miss Tourism Queen International 2009 in China. Marian Michelle Oblea of Obando became the Miss Water (3rd Runner-up). Maria Kristelle Lazaro of Candaba got the title of Miss Fire (4th Runner-up) and Teresa Pamela Ludovice won the Miss Eco Tourism (5th Runner-up).

Aside from Miss Philippines Earth 2008 title, The 1st Runner-up or Miss PAGCOR International Tourism Ambassadress which was won by Melanie Felix that night was awarded to her.

Results
Color keys

Contestants
There are forty-one official contestants for Miss Philippines Earth 2008.

Judges
 H.E. Gerard Chesnel, Ambassador Extraordinary and Plenipotentiary to the Republic of the Philippines/ Embassy of France - Chairman of the Judges
 Mr. Kim Atienza, Multi Awarded Broadcaster, ABS-CBN
 Ricky Reyes, Entrepreneur and Salon Chain Owner
 Anne Curtis, Actress and Commercial Model
 Gen. Manuel Roxas, PAGCOR Director
 Ms. Bridgitte Trattner, General Manager, Crowne Plaza Galleria
 Mr. Eric Pineda, Costume and Fashion Designer at De La Salle College
 Dr. Corazon PB. Claudio, President of Earth Institute Asia
 Mr. Hong Jin, Regional Manager of Korean Air
 Ms. Celine Clemente, President of Asian Gem

Preliminary activities
Follow the candidates preliminary activities

2008 Lil' Earth Angels
Miss Lil' Earth Angels 2008 is the second edition of Miss Lil' Earth Angels pageant. The 2008 Lil' Earth Angels concluded on May 11, 2008 at Crowne Plaza Galleria, Ortigas Center, Manila, Philippines together with the Miss Philippines Earth 2008 pageant.

Ten finalists were selected based on their preliminary activities that was held at Robinsons Malls in the Philippines. At the end of the night, Miss Lil' Earth Angel 2007 Denisse Mikaela Abuan crowned her successor.

Results

Finalists

References

External links
Official Website
Lil' Earth Angels Official Website
Mabuhay Beauties

2008
2008 beauty pageants
2008 in the Philippines
May 2008 events in the Philippines